Lawrence "Larry" Hott is an American academic and documentary filmmaker.

Hott is a co-founding partner of Florentine Films, joining  Ken Burns, Roger Sherman and Buddy Squires in documentary production in 1978. He has produced and directed  documentary films for PBS, the Library of American Landscape History, the American Antiquarian Society and others. He  has twice been nominated for an Academy Award,
received a Peabody Award, the Alfred I. duPont-Columbia University Award, and five blue ribbons from the American Film Festival.  Hott has taught courses in the University Without Walls program of the University of Massachusetts Amherst.

Hott is a member of the Academy of Motion Picture Arts and Sciences. Hott has been a Fulbright Program Fellow in both Vietnam and Great Britain.

Filmography
 The Old Quabbin Valley 1982
 The Garden of Eden 1983
 The Adirondacks 1986
 Sentimental Women Need Not Apply 1988
 The Wilderness Idea 1989
 Wild by Law 1991
 Knute Rockne and His Fighting Irish 1994
 Defending Everybody: The Story of the ACLU 1998
 The People's Plague: Tuberculosis in America
 The Boyhood Of John Muir 1998
 Divided Highways 1998
 Writing Alone and With Others
 Ohio: 200 Years
 Imagining Robert: My Brother, Madness and Survival
 The Harriman Alaska Expedition Retraced 2002
 John James Audubon: Drawn from Nature 2006
 Niagara Falls 2006
 On Thin Ice
 Through Deaf Eyes 2006
 The American Antiquarian Society
 Library of American Landscape History
 The Return of the Cuyahoga
 Frederick Law Olmsted: Designing America
 Rising Voices 2014
 Scitech Band: Pride of Springfield 2017
 The Warrior Tradition 2019
 The Niagara Movement: The Early Battle for Civil Rights 2023

References

External links
 Online films by Hott for the Library of American Landscape History
 Online films by Hott for the American Antiquarian Society
 PBS website Harriman Alaskaa Expedtion Retraced
 Every Cut is a Lie: Lawrence Hott at TEDxFulbright

University of Massachusetts Amherst faculty
American documentary filmmakers
Living people
1950 births